The Furnia de Catanamatias, also known as El Respiradero del Diablo, is the deepest cave in Dominican Republic, located near Las Matas de Farfán, San Juan, in the Sierra de Neiba mountain range. 
The cave was discovered in 1988 by a group of Italian cavers who explored it to a depth of 380 meters.

The cave entrance is huge, and gives access to a gallery with an inclination of 47°. The section of this gallery is 30m wide and 20m high. In this gallery, a noise similar to a deep and rythmic breathing can be heard, which accounts for the name of the cave.

References

Caves of the Dominican Republic
Caves of the Caribbean